Dušan Lajović was the defending champion but chose not to defend his title.

Adam Pavlásek won the title after defeating Miljan Zekić 3–6, 6–1, 6–4 in the final.

Seeds

Draw

Finals

Top half

Bottom half

References
 Main Draw
 Qualifying Draw

Banja Luka Challenger - Singles
2016 Singles
2016 in Bosnia and Herzegovina